Ivaylo Tsvetkov (born 28 August 1979) is a Bulgarian former footballer who played as a midfielder.

References

1979 births
Living people
Bulgarian footballers
First Professional Football League (Bulgaria) players
PFC Rilski Sportist Samokov players
FC Lokomotiv 1929 Sofia players
PFC Vidima-Rakovski Sevlievo players
PFC Minyor Pernik players

Association football defenders